Josephine Margetts (October 8, 1901 – March 3, 1989) was an American politician. She was a member of the New Jersey General Assembly from 1967 to 1973.

She was a graduate of the Ambler School of Horticulture.

A resident of Harding Township, New Jersey, she was the wife of New Jersey State Treasurer Walter T. Margetts.

References

External links
NJ Assembly member Josephine Margetts at work

1901 births
1989 deaths
Republican Party members of the New Jersey General Assembly
People from Harding Township, New Jersey
Politicians from Morris County, New Jersey